Mike Christie is a British film and television director and producer who has made films for the BBC, Channel 4, Sky, Discovery, History Channel, Apple, Showtime and Red Bull. His career began in the 1990s working with the artist and filmmaker Derek Jarman – who he met at meetings of Act Up London – on projects including the book At Your Own Risk. Other early collaborators included Pet Shop Boys and Suede with whom he worked from 1992 to 1997. In 1997, he co-created Drop the Debt, the mainstream music and entertainment industries campaign of the Jubilee 2000 movement, fronted by Bono and others, and led to the cancellation of more than $100 billion of debt owed by 35 of the poorest countries.

Christie's Parkour documentaries Jump London (2003) and Jump Britain (2005), debuting Sebastien Foucan, presented the discipline to a global audience for the first time. In recognition, in 2010, Christie was nicknamed the "godfather" of Parkour by one of the sport's publications. Following the success of Jump London, in 2004 Mike Christie founded production company Carbon Media, which was sold to ITV in 2009.  Other work includes Concrete Circus (2011), the RTS award-winning and triple BAFTA nominated Channel 4 multi-platform project Big Art, The Secret Life of Buildings (2011), Danny MacAskill's Imaginate (2013), Sir Alex Ferguson: Secrets of Success (2015), RTS award nominated series Football: A Brief History by Alfie Allen (2016), The Art of China with Andrew Graham-Dixon (2014), The Art Show (2017), Grierson Award shortlisted Hansa Studios: By The Wall 1976–90 (2018), Little Britain Down Under (2007), Body Talk (2004) New Order: Decades (2018), and Suede: The Insatiable Ones (2018).

References

External links 

  
 Jump London review, The Guardian 10 Sept 2003
 Jump Magazine interview, 2010
 Suede The Insatiable Ones review, British GQ feature Nov 2018
 Red Bull interview 2013
 Broadcast Magazine interview 25 September 2018
 Website

Living people
Mass media people from Manchester
English television directors
Action film directors
Year of birth missing (living people)